Lorraine Pilkington (born 18 April 1974) is an Irish actress from Dublin who is best known for her role as Katrina Finlay from Monarch of the Glen.

Life
Born in Dublin, Pilkington grew up in the affluent suburban village of Malahide, and attended Manor House School, Raheny.

Trained at the Gaiety School of Acting, Pilkington began her career at the age of 15 when she appeared in The Miracle directed by Neil Jordan. She appeared onstage in the plays The Plough and the Stars and The Iceman Cometh. 

At age 18 she moved to London where she was given a part in a Miramax film which eventually fell through. After returning to Dublin, Pilkington appeared in films including Human Traffic and My Kingdom, a retelling of King Lear. 

In 2000, she was cast as Katrina Finlay, a schoolteacher in a Scottish village in the BBC television series Monarch of the Glen. After leaving the show at the beginning of the third season, she appeared in various other television productions such as Rough Diamond and Outnumbered. 

She married Simon Massey, the director of Monarch of the Glen, in 2001. They have three sons, Milo,  Luca and Inigo.

In 2008, she appeared in a short film by Luke Massey Within the Woods, with James Chalmers.

In 2016 she voiced the lead role in a Paramount animation Capture the Flag.

Filmography
 1991 The Miracle 1996 The Last of the High Kings 1998 The Nephew 1999 Human Traffic 2001 My Kingdom 2004 Rabbit on the Moon 2006 After Thomas 2006 In a Day 2008 Within the Woods (short film)
 2012 What Richard Did 2016 Capture the Flag (voice role)

Television
 2000 Monarch of the Glen 2003 The Clinic on RTÉ One
 2003 Waking the Dead episode "Walking on Water" as Mandy Lovell
 2005 Robotboy on Cartoon Network as Tommy Turnbull, Debbie Turnbull and Computer Teacher
 2007 Rough Diamond on RTÉ One
 2008 Britannia High on ITV1 as Anna
 2008 Outnumbered on BBC1 as Barbara
 2011 Narrator on Masterchef Ireland on RTÉ Two
 2016, 2017 & 2019 Casualty'' on BBC One as Rosa Hide (Nurse David Hide's ex-wife)

References

External links

1974 births
People from Malahide
Irish television actresses
Irish film actresses
Living people
People educated at Manor House School, Raheny